The Château de la Gaude: Hotel, gourmet restaurant and shop in Aix-en-Provence.

Location
It is located on the Route des Pinchinats in Aix-en-Provence. It is on the same road as the Château de la Mignarde, another listed chateau, though further north.

History
It was built in the eighteenth century. It spans seventeen hectares. The driveway to the three-story bastide is bordered by chestnut trees on each side. The garden has ponds, fountains, a French formal garden with a yew maze, several terraces, and even an alleyway for butterfly-hunting. Additionally, there is a chapel. The estate is also home to a vineyard, and sells wine.

It is owned by Didier Blaise.

Heritage significance
It has been listed as a monument historique since 1963.

References

Gaude
Wineries of France
Monuments historiques of Aix-en-Provence